The 1983 Washington State Cougars football team represented Washington State University in the 1983 NCAA Division I-A football season as a member of the Pacific-10 Conference (Pac-10). Led by sixth-year head coach Jim Walden, WSU was 7–4 overall (5–3 in Pac-10, third), and played their home games at Joe Albi Stadium in Spokane and at Martin Stadium in Pullman, Washington.
 
The team's statistical leaders included Ricky Turner with 1,351 passing yards, Kerry Porter with 1,000 rushing yards, and John Marshall with 328 receiving yards. Sophomore quarterback Mark Rypien started two games in September, but was sidelined with a broken collarbone.

The Cougars won a second straight Apple Cup over rival Washington, their first victory at Husky Stadium in Seattle in a decade.

Walden was named the Pac-10 Coach of the Year, and four Cougars were selected to the conference's first team: linemen Keith Millard and Eric Williams on defense, with guard Dan Lynch and sophomore running back Kerry Porter on offense. Millard was the thirteenth overall pick of the 1984 NFL Draft, selected by the Minnesota Vikings.

This is the most recent season in which selected home games were played in Spokane, and the Cougars won both. With a change in the academic calendar in 1984, classes started at WSU a month earlier, in late August, and all home games were scheduled for Pullman. (Home games in Seattle at Lumen Field were played from 2002 to 2014.)

Schedule

Coaching staff
Head Coach: Jim Walden
Assistants: Jim Burrow, Dave Elliott, Jon Fabris, Gary Gagnon, Lindsay Hughes, Steve Morton, Mel Sanders, Del Wight, Ken Woody

Game summaries

Oregon

Roster

NFL Draft
Three Cougars were selected in the 1984 NFL Draft.

References

Washington State
Washington State Cougars football seasons
Washington State Cougars football